Judenklub is a derogatory, antisemitic term used throughout the Nazi era in Germany and Austria, applied to association football clubs with strong Jewish heritage and connections. Some of the most prominent clubs referred to in such a way by the Nazis were FC Bayern Munich, FK Austria Wien, Eintracht Frankfurt and FSV Frankfurt.

In more recent times the term has occasionally also been used in the German-language press when reporting on antisemitic chants and attacks by rival fan groups on non-German clubs like Tottenham Hotspur, AFC Ajax, RSC Anderlecht and KS Cracovia who have a Jewish heritage or connection.

FC Bayern Munich
FC Bayern Munich, founded in the bohemian Munich suburb of Schwabing, had a strong Jewish background before the Nazis rise to power and won their first German championship in 1932 under the direction of a Jewish president and coach. In 1933 president Kurt Landauer, director of the youth department Otto Beer and coach Richard Dombi had to leave the club because of their Jewish background and the club consequently declined, losing a large number of its members. Bayern, far less popular with the Nazis than local rival TSV 1860 Munich, had very limited success in the Gauliga Bayern during this era but continued small acts of defiance like the team acknowledging former president Landauer while on a friendly in Switzerland in 1943, where the latter had emigrated to.

For many decades after the end of the Second World War the Jewish past and the events of the Nazi era received little attention from the side of the club until 2011 when the book Der FC Bayern und seine Juden (FC Bayern and their Jews) was published and renewed interest. Until then the club, for various reasons, had been reluctant to address its own history during the Nazi era.

FK Austria Wien
Like Bayern Munich, FK Austria Wien, based in Vienna, had, from its formation, been led and influenced by Jewish citizens. The club experienced little antisemitic behaviour until the Anschluss of Austria into Nazi Germany in March 1938 but this radically changed from then on. After the Anschluss Austria was forced to change its name for a time to SC Ostmark, having to evict all its Jewish members and experiencing only limited amount of success in the Gauliga Ostmark during the time. Austria Wien's Jewish president, escaped Nazi Germany like Bayern Munich's Kurt Landauer but had a much more difficult time evading arrest and, like Landauer, led his club once more after the Second World War.

See also
Antisemitism in the Olympic Games
Jewish Olympics
Muscular Judaism
Superjews, a nickname of the Dutch soccer club AFC Ajax
Yids, a nickname for the English soccer club Tottenham Hotspur F.C.
List of ethnic sports team and mascot names

References

Further reading
 

Antisemitism in Austria
Antisemitism in Germany
Football in Austria
History of football in Germany
Pejorative terms
Jewish Nazi German history
Jewish football clubs
Hakoah sport clubs
Sports controversies
Racism in association football